Nikolai Petrovich Linevich, also Lenevich and Linevitch (– ) was a career military officer, General of Infantry (1903) and Adjutant general in the Imperial Russian Army in the Far East during the latter part of the Russo-Japanese War.

Biography
A nobleman born in Chernigov (today's Chernihiv in Ukraine), Linevich entered military service as a cadet in 1855. Stationed with the 75th Infantry Regiment at Sevastopol, his first combat experience was against the mountain tribes of the western Caucasus Mountains.  He made a name for himself in the Russo-Turkish War (1877-1878), and was appointed commander of the South Ussuri Division in 1895.

During the Boxer Rebellion, Linevich was commander of the 1st Siberian Army Corps. He participated in the Battle of Peking in 1900. In 1903, he was appointed commander of the Amur Military District as Governor-General of Dauria.

At the outbreak of the Russo-Japanese War, Linevich was temporarily in charge of the Russian Manchurian Army until the arrival of General Aleksey Kuropatkin on March 15, 1904.  He was again placed in command of the First Manchurian Army from October 1904 to March 3, 1905. After the Russian defeat at the Battle of Mukden, General Kuropatkin was relieved of his command, and Linevich was promoted to succeed him as commander in chief of the Russian armies in the Far East. However, once promoted, Linevich procrastinated, irking Tsar Nicholas II with never-ending demands for reinforcements, insisting that he had to have a 1.5:1 numerical superiority before he would be able to go on the offensive against the Japanese positions. He opposed peace negotiations with Japan, advising Tsar Nicholas that victory on land was certain once the requisite reinforcements arrived. After the Treaty of Portsmouth ended the war, Linevich oversaw the evacuation of Russian forces from Manchuria, hampered by strikes and revolutionary agitation by the railroad workers. He refused to take action against the workers, and when a portion of his troops revolted as part of the Russian Revolution of 1905, he was in no hurry to put down the risings. As a result, he was relieved of his duties in February 1906.
Linevich spent the rest of his life in retirement. His wartime journal (The Russian-Japanese War. From the diaries AN Kuropatkin and NP Linevich) was published posthumously in 1925.

Honors
 Order of St. George, 3rd class, August 1900
 Order of St. George, 4th class
 Order of St Vladimir, 3rd degree,
 Order of St Vladimir, 4th degree
 Order of St. Anne 3rd degree
 Order of St. Stanislaus 3rd degree
 Order of Leopold, 1st degree (Belgium)
 Order of the Rising Sun, 1st degree, (Japan)
 Order of St. Andrew

References
Connaughton, R.M (1988). The War of the Rising Sun and the Tumbling Bear—A Military History of the Russo-Japanese War 1904–5, London, .
Jukes, Geoffry. The Russo-Japanese War 1904–1905.  Osprey Essential Histories. (2002).  .

Warner, Denis & Peggy. The Tide at Sunrise, A History of the Russo-Japanese War 1904–1905. (1975).  .

Notes

Notes
 This article is based on a translation of the equivalent article of the Russian Wikipedia on 5 January 2011.

External links
Russian Operations in the Boxer Rebellion

1839 births
1908 deaths
People from Chernihiv
Imperial Russian Army generals
Russian military personnel of the Boxer Rebellion
Russian military personnel of the Russo-Japanese War
Recipients of the Order of St. George of the Third Degree
Recipients of the Order of Saint Stanislaus (Russian), 3rd class
Recipients of the Order of St. Anna, 3rd class
Recipients of the Order of St. Vladimir, 3rd class
Grand Cordons of the Order of the Rising Sun
Burials at Nikolskoe Cemetery